Salinas Victoria, is a municipality located to in the center of the state of Nuevo León, Mexico. It shares borders with 11 municipalities including, to the north Villaldama and Sabinas Hidalgo; to the south Escobedo and Apodaca; to the east Higueras, Ciénega de Flores and General Zuazua; and finally to the west with Mina, Hidalgo, Abasolo and El Carmen. 

Salinas Victoria's extension is 1,334.20 square kilometers. According to the 2005 census, it has a population of 27,848 people.

Origin of the name
"Salinas" (Spanish for salt marshes) was chosen because the lands present saline characteristics. "Victoria" after the first Mexican president Guadalupe Victoria.

References

External links

Populated places in Nuevo León
Monterrey metropolitan area